Tresawle is a hamlet east of Tresillian, Cornwall, England, United Kingdom.

References

Hamlets in Cornwall